HMS Dartmouth was a  light cruiser built for the Royal Navy in the 1910s. She was one of the Weymouth sub-class of the Town class. The ship survived the First World War and was sold for scrap in 1930.

Construction and design
Dartmouth was laid down by Vickers at their Barrow shipyard on 19 February 1910, one of four Town-class protected cruisers ordered under the 1909–1910 Naval Estimates. The four 1909–10 ships, also known as the Weymouth class, were an improved version of five similar Town-class ships laid down under the 1908–1909 Estimates, known as the Bristol class, with a heavier main armament of eight 6 inch (152 mm) Mk XI guns, compared with the two 6 inch and ten 4 inch of the earlier ships. The ships had a secondary armament of four Vickers 3-pounder (47 mm) guns, with two submerged 21 inch (533 mm) torpedo tubes mounted on the ships' beams.

Machinery was the same as in the Bristol class, with 12 Yarrow boilers feeding Parsons steam turbines, driving four shafts. The turbines were laid out in three separate engine rooms, with high pressure turbines, located in wing compartments, driving the outer shafts and low pressure turbines in a central compartment. The ship had four funnels.

Dartmouth was launched on 14 February 1911,  reaching a speed of  during sea trials. She was completed in October 1911, at a cost of £320,406.

Service history

On commissioning, Dartmouth joined the Atlantic Fleet, being attached to the Third Battle Squadron from 1912 to 1913. After a 1913 cruise to the Mediterranean Sea, she was briefly attached to the Second Light Cruiser Squadron at Devonport to participate in the 1913 Naval Manoeuvres before leaving to join the East Indies Squadron of the Eastern Fleet.

On the outbreak of the First World War, Dartmouth was docked at Bombay, but was soon returned to sea, escorting a troop convoy from Karachi to Mombasa in Kenya and then taking part in the search for the German cruiser . On 9 October that year she captured the German tug Adjutant in the Mozambique Channel. On 30 October, the cruiser  spotted Königsberg moored up the Rufiji delta, and on 2 November, Dartmouth attempted to engage Königsberg or the supporting steamer Somali but the German ships were too far upstream to be successfully engaged. On 10 November, the British scuttled the collier Newbridge in the Rufiji River as a blockship to prevent Königsberg from escaping, and on 11 November, Dartmouth left to reinforce the Cape of Good Hope Station in the aftermath of the Battle of Coronel. In January 1915, Dartmouth was reassigned to the 2nd Light Cruiser Squadron of the Grand Fleet but was detached to operate in the South Atlantic in the search for the commerce raider . (Unknown to the Royal Navy, Karlsruhe had already been lost, sunk by an internal explosion on 4 November 1914 near Barbados.)

In February 1915, Dartmouth was sent to join the forces operating off the Dardanelles in support of the Gallipoli Campaign. On 15 March she suffered a boiler explosion that killed 15 of her crew. Despite this damage, Dartmouth continued operations, and on 18 March Dartmouth patrolled off the West coast of the Gallipoli peninsula while a final attempt was made by the battleships of the fleet to force the straits during daylight. The attack was a failure, with three battleships sunk by mines, and several more ships heavily damages by mines or by Turkish gunfire. Dartmouth escorted the battlecruiser , badly damaged by striking a mine, to Tenedos. On 25 April, the Allies landed troops at Anzac Cove and Cape Helles on the Gallipoli peninsula, with Dartmouth taking part in a diversionary simulated landing further north, at Bulair.

In May 1915, Dartmouth was reassigned to the 8th Light Cruiser Squadron at Brindisi, supporting Italian forces in the Adriatic Sea. As a result, on 30 June Dartmouth paid off at Malta for a refit, not recommissioning until 1 October. In the resulting Battle off Durazzo, Dartmouth scored several hits on the Austrian cruiser .

On 14/15 May 1917, Dartmouth took part in the Battle of the Otranto Straits. A force of three Austro-Hungarian cruisers (Helgoland,  and  carried out an attack on the drifters of the Otranto Barrage, while two destroyers  and  carried out a diversionary attack against merchant shipping off Albania. The two destroyers attacked an Italian convoy at about 03:30 Central European Time (CET), sinking the Italian destroyer  and the freighter Carrocio, with the main cruiser attack on the drifter line starting at about 04:20 CET, with 14 of the lightly armed drifters sunk and four more damaged. Dartmouth was hit several times by shellfire from Austro-Hungarian cruisers which she was pursuing, and had to heave to. Returning to port she was hit by a torpedo from the German submarine  and began sinking. The order to abandon ship was given but a small team volunteered to remain on board manning the pumps while the Dartmouth was towed to port.

Dartmouth was drydocked and repaired and went on to survive the war.

She was sold for scrapping on 13 December 1930 to Alloa Ship Breaking Company of Rosyth.

Notes

Bibliography

External links
 
 Ships of the Weymouth group

 

Town-class cruisers (1910) of the Royal Navy
Ships built in Barrow-in-Furness
1911 ships
World War I cruisers of the United Kingdom
Maritime incidents in 1917